Francis Webb Wentworth-Sheilds (born Sheilds; 8 October 1820 – 18 January 1906) was an Anglo-Irish civil engineer on the Sydney Railway Company during its construction but before its opening.

In Great Britain and Ireland, Sheilds worked on a number of railway projects, including the then  Dublin and Kingstown Railway. He considered himself to be a born railway engineer.

City Surveyor 
Sheilds was the Sydney City Surveyor in 1843 for a few years where he worked on water works. He resigned in 1849, in order to take up a post with the Sydney Railway Company.

Sydney Railway Company engineer 
Sheilds had worked on railways in Ireland, which had adopted  as its own standard gauge. His proposal was backed by the British Board of Trade, and agreed to by all Australian colonies.

Sheilds resigned in 1850 when his pay was cut due to the company's financial difficulties. However, the construction of  broad gauge lines had already started in Victoria and South Australia, and the necessary rolling stock had been ordered. The two colonies strongly protested about the change and declined to follow suit.

See also 
 Rail gauge in Australia

References 

 Wentworth-Sheilds Family History details

External links
 

Irish engineers
19th-century Irish people
People from County Meath
Australian engineers
1820 births
1906 deaths